Don’t Let the Good Times Fool You is a studio album by American country artist, Melba Montgomery. It was released March 17, 1975 via Elektra Records and was the twentieth studio album in her recording career. The disc contained 11 tracks featuring mostly original material, some of which was penned by Montgomery herself. Four singles were included, which all placed on the country charts. Among them was the title track, which reached the top 20 in 1975. The album itself also charted on the American country albums survey in 1975. It received a positive review from Billboard magazine following its release.

Background, recording and content
Previously known for her sixties duet recordings with George Jones, Melba Montgomery established herself as a solo artist during the seventies. In 1974, she topped the country charts with a song about motherhood called "No Charge". Her solo commercial success came from a new recording contract with Elektra Records, which would continue releasing her music through the mid seventies. Montgomery followed the success of "No Charge" with her next studio album called Don't Let the Good Times Fool You. The album was recorded in May 1974 at Pete's Place, a studio located in Nashville, Tennessee. The studio was owned by the album's producer, Pete Drake.

Don't Let the Good Times Fool You consisted of 11 tracks. The title track, for which the album was named for was among several recordings that were original material. Two of the original tracks on the project were penned by Montgomery herself: "Hiding in the Darkness of My Mind" and "It Sure Gets Lonely". The disc also featured writing credits from Montgomery's brother (and established Nashville songwriter) Earl Montgomery. Other tracks were covers such as "I'll Be Your Lady", which was originally recorded by (and written by) David Allan Coe. His version was originally called "Would You Be My Lady" and it reached number 91 on the Billboard country chart in 1975. Montgomery also covered Kitty Wells's 1956 top five country single, "Searchin' (For Someone Like You)".

Release, chart performance, reception and singles
Don't Let the Good Times Fool You was released in April 1975 on Elektra Records. It was Montgomery's twentieth studio album released in her recording career and her third with Elektra. The label issued it originally as both a vinyl LP and as a cassette. Following its release, the disc reached number 47 on the American Billboard Top Country Albums chart. It was Montgomery's second (and final) solo studio album to make the country albums chart. In their 1975 review, Billboard magazine called the disc "an excellent album" and the title track "a smash single".

The album was preceded by the release of three singles. Its first was "Your Pretty Roses Came Too Late" in July 1974. Despite the commercial success of "No Charge", the new single only climbed to number 67 on the Billboard Hot Country Songs chart. It was followed in October 1974 by the release of the second single titled "If You Want the Rainbow". However, the song only reached number 59 on the Hot Country Songs chart. The title track was released as the third single in January 1975 and proved to be the only commercial success from the album. It reached number 15 on the Billboard country chart and number 14 on Canada's RPM Country Tracks survey. The fourth and final single was "Searchin' (For Someone Like You)", which only reached number 45 on the Billboard country chart in 1975.

Track listing

Personnel
All credited are adapted from the liner notes of Don't Let the Good Times Fool You.

Musical personnel
Bass: Bob Moore, Henry Strzelecki
Drums: Buddy Harman, Kenny Malone
Piano: Hargus "Pig" Robbins, Ron Oates
Lead Guitar: Pete Wade, Reggie Young
Acoustic Guitar: Jack Solomon, Larry Black
Steel Guitar: Larry Sasser, Pete Drake
Bass Guitar: Harold Bradley, Tommy Allsup
Fiddles: Buddy Spicher, Duane Hester, Gary Van Osdale, George Binkley, Sheldon Kurland, Larry Haight
Vocals: The Jordanaires & La Verna, Garry S. Paxton Singers

Technical personnel
Producer: Pete Drake for Pete Drake Productions Inc.
Recorded at: Pete’s Place, Nashville, Tenn.
Engineer: Stan Kesler
Mixer: Pete Drake
Recorders: Warren Peterson, Linda Hargrove
Arranger: Pete Drake
Album Art Direction: Glen Christensen
Album Design: Gribitt
Album Photography: Joel Brodsky

Charts

Release history

References

1975 albums
Albums produced by Pete Drake
Elektra Records albums
Melba Montgomery albums